Vedergällningen (The Retribution) is Garmarna's third full-length album.  All the songs are sung in Swedish.  "Euchari" also contains some Latin.

Track listing 

 "Gamen (The Vulture)" – 4:01
 "Euchari" – 4:21
 "Halling Jåron" – 3:03
 "Vedergällningen (The Retribution)" – 4:55
 "Nio år (Nine Years)" – 4:29
 "Sorgsen ton (Sorrowful Tone)" – 4:47
 "Herr Holkin (Sir Holkin)" – 5:17
 "Bläck (Ink)" – 5:05
 "Polska" – 3:07
 "Brun (Brown)" – 8:28

Credits 

drums: Jens Höglin
guitar: Rickard Westman
Guitar, violin: Gotte Ringqvist, Stefan Brisland-Ferner
production, arrangement, bass: Sank
vocals: Emma Härdelin

Garmarna albums
1999 albums
Swedish-language albums